Manchester is a city in Northwest England.  The M21 postcode area of the city includes the suburb of Chorlton-cum-Hardy.  This postcode area contains 19 listed buildings that are recorded in the National Heritage List for England.  Of these, one is listed at Grade II*, the middle of the three grades, and the others are at Grade II, the lowest grade.  The area is mainly residential. It also contains Southern Cemetery, and a number of buildings associated with this are listed, including structures at the entrance, the chapels, a memorial, and the crematorium.  Most of the other listed buildings are houses, and also included are a church, a public house and hotel, the gateway to a former church, a library, and a war memorial.


Key

Buildings

References

Citations

Sources

Lists of listed buildings in Greater Manchester
Buildings and structures in Manchester